The Men's 100 metre freestyle competition of the 2018 African Swimming Championships was held on 12 September 2018.

Records
Prior to the competition, the existing world and championship records were as follows.

The following new records were set during this competition.

Results

Heats
The heats were started on 12 September at 09:50.

Final
The final was started on 12 September.

References

Men's 100 metre freestyle